The Chinese Ambassador to Guinea is the official representative of the People's Republic of China to the Republic of Guinea.

List of representatives

References 

 
Guinea
China